The North American Vegetarian Society (NAVS) is a charity and activist organization with the stated objectives of supporting vegetarians and informing the public about the benefits of vegetarianism.

It was initially founded in 1974 to organize the International Vegetarian Union's 1975 World Vegetarian Congress in Orono, Maine, which has been called the most significant event of the vegetarian movement in the United States in the 20th Century.

In 1977, the organization started an annual event, World Vegetarian Day. The following year the International Vegetarian Union joined in holding the event. The event is celebrated October 1 of each year and kicks off a month-long event, Vegetarian Awareness Month, which ends November 1 with World Vegan Day.

Vegan Hall of Fame 
NAVS initiated the Vegetarian Hall of Fame (now the Vegan Hall of Fame) in 1990, which has enshrined 33 activists.

NAVS Vegan Summerfest
Since 1974, the NAVS has run an annual vegetarian summer conference - originally for 9–10 days encompassing two full weekends, on a college or university campus (often in Pennsylvania).  In 199x the summer conference's name was changed to NAVS Vegetarian Summerfest (with all vegan meals).  In 2019, the name was changed to NAVS Vegan Summerfest.  During this now 5-day event, the inductee for the Vegan Hall of Fame is announced and celebrated.  The most frequent Summerfest site is the University of Pittsburgh-Johnstown (UPJ) in Johnstown, Pennsylvania.  In 1996, the World Vegetarian Congress was held simultaneously with the NAVS Vegetarian Summerfest, in Johnstown.  Three international vegetarian conferences have been held simultaneously with the NAVS Vegan Summerfests.

See also
 American Vegan Society
 List of vegetarian organizations

References 

Vegetarian organizations
Vegetarianism in the United States
Organizations established in 1974